Meckelin is a protein that in humans is encoded by the TMEM67 gene.

Function 

The protein encoded by this gene localizes to the primary cilium and to the plasma membrane. The gene functions in centriole migration to the apical membrane and formation of the primary cilium. Multiple transcript variants encoding different isoforms have been found for this gene.

Clinical significance 

Defects in this gene are a cause of Meckel syndrome type 3 (MKS3), nephronophthisis and Joubert syndrome type 6 (JBTS6).

See also
 Meckel syndrome

References

Further reading